Sitona lineellus, the alfalfa curculio, is a species of broad-nosed weevil in the beetle family Curculionidae. It is found in North America.

Subspecies
These two subspecies belong to the species Sitona lineellus:
 Sitona lineellus crinitoides Reitter, 1903 c g
 Sitona lineellus samniticus F.Solari, 1948 c g
Data sources: i = ITIS, c = Catalogue of Life, g = GBIF, b = Bugguide.net

References

Further reading

 
 

Entiminae
Articles created by Qbugbot
Beetles described in 1785